The Barxell Castle, located in the municipality of Alcoy, Alicante, Spain, is a 13th-century medieval building which stands on a rocky mound in the middle of a pine forest. It is next to the CV-795 road, between Alcoy and Banyeres de Mariola. It is located in the rural place of Barxell at 800 metres altitude. It is very close to the "Solanetes" which had a small population in the Muslim era.

The Barxell Castle is located in the rural place of Barxell, in the Valley of Polop, a natural enclave of great scenic value between two natural parks, the Font Roja and Serra Mariola.

Bibliography 

PAREDES VAÑÓ, Enric (2006), "El castell de Barxell" en Història d'Alcoi, Alcoi: Ajuntament d'Alcoi, Editorial Marfil, S.A., Centre Alcoià d'estudis Històrics i Arqueològics (p. 133) 
PAREDES VAÑÓ, Enric (2011), "Aproximación a la arquitectura de las fortificaciones en las montañas del valle central del Serpis. Las Torres". Actas del Séptimo Congreso Nacional de Historia de la Construcción. Instituto Juan de Herrera - Madrid - 2011.  | 2 vols., 146 comunicaciones, 1507 pp.

See also 

 Font Roja Natural Park
 Serra Mariola Natural Park
 Route of the Castles of Vinalopó
 Castle of Banyeres
 Cocentaina Castle

References

External links 
File at the Valencial Library of Heritage

Castles in the Valencian Community
Buildings and structures in Alcoy
Bien de Interés Cultural landmarks in the Province of Alicante